Ove Nils Bengtson (born 5 April 1945) is a former professional tennis player from Sweden. He enjoyed most of his tennis success while playing doubles. During his career, he won five doubles titles. Bengtson was a member of the Swedish Davis Cup team from 1967 to 1979, posting a 7–14 record in singles and a 15–14 record in doubles. He was part of the Swedish team winning the 1975 Davis Cup, defeating Czechoslovakia in the final in Stockholm.

Career finals

Singles: 1 (1 title)

Doubles (5 titles, 4 runner-ups)

References

External links
 
 
 

1945 births
Living people
People from Danderyd Municipality
Swedish male tennis players
Sportspeople from Stockholm County
20th-century Swedish people